

Rudolf Lippert (29 October 1900 – 1 April 1945) was a German horse rider who competed in the 1936 Summer Olympics. He was also a recipient of the Knight's Cross of the Iron Cross during World War II.

In 1936 he and his horse Fasan won the gold medal as part of the German eventing team in the team eventing competition after finishing sixth in the individual eventing competition.

Awards

 Knight's Cross of the Iron Cross on 9 June 1944 as Oberst and commander of Panzer-Regiment 31

References

Citations

Bibliography

External links
Rolf Lippert - Profile on DatabaseOlympic.com

1900 births
1945 deaths
Sportspeople from Leipzig
German event riders
Olympic equestrians of Germany
German male equestrians
Equestrians at the 1928 Summer Olympics
Equestrians at the 1936 Summer Olympics
Olympic gold medalists for Germany
Major generals of the German Army (Wehrmacht)
Recipients of the clasp to the Iron Cross, 2nd class
Recipients of the Knight's Cross of the Iron Cross
German Army personnel of World War I
Olympic medalists in equestrian
People from the Kingdom of Saxony
German Army personnel killed in World War II
Medalists at the 1936 Summer Olympics
Military personnel from Leipzig
German Army generals of World War II